The 2005 IBF World Championships (World Badminton Championships) took place in Arrowhead Pond in Anaheim, United States, between August 15 and August 21, 2005. Following the results in the women's doubles.

Seeds
 Yang Wei / Zhang Jiewen, Champions
 Gao Ling / Huang Sui, Runners-up
 Wei Yili / Zhao Tingting, Quarter-final
 Lee Kyung-won / Lee Hyo-jung, Semi-final
 Zhang Dan / Zhang Yawen, Semi-final
 Saralee Thungthongkam / Sathinee Chankrachangwong, Quarter-final
 Wong Pei Tty / Chin Eei Hui, Quarter-final 
 Gail Emms / Donna Kellogg, Quarter-final
 Ella Tripp / Joanne Wright, Second round
 Jiang Yanmei / Li Yujia, Third round
 Tracey Hallam / Natalie Munt, Third round
 Chien Yu-chin / Cheng Wen-hsing, Third round
 Helle Nielsen / Pernille Harder, Third round
 Charmaine Reid / Helen Nichol, Second round
 Kumiko Ogura / Reiko Shiota, First round
 Liza Parker / Suzanne Rayappan, Third round

Main stage

Section 1

Section 2

Section 3

Section 4

Final stage

External links 
2005 IBF results

Women's doubles
IBF